Nationality words link to articles with information on the nation's poetry or literature (for instance, Irish or France).

Events
 February 17 – On the death of Montserrat-born British fantasy fiction writer M. P. Shiel, his supposed title to the Kingdom of Redonda passes to London poet John Gawsworth.
 March – Landfall literary magazine is founded by Charles Brasch and first published by Caxton Press (New Zealand); it becomes that country's oldest literary journal.
 November – Muriel Spark becomes editor of Poetry Review in London from this month's issue.
 Dorothy Parker divorces Alan Campbell for the first time.

Works published in English
Listed by nation where the work was first published and again by the poet's native land, if different; substantially revised works listed separately:

Canada
 Arthur Bourinot, The Collected Poems of Arthur S. Bourinot (Toronto: Ryerson Press).
 Paul Hiebert, Sarah Binks, "the sweet songstess of Saskatchewan", [satirical fictional biography of a Prairie poet]
 Archibald Lampman, Selected Poems, edited by Duncan Campbell Scott, published posthumously
 Dorothy Livesay, Poems for People. Toronto: Ryerson. Governor General's Award 1947.
 E. J. Pratt:
Behind the Log, Toronto: Macmillan.
Ten Selected Poems, Toronto: Macmillan.
 Duncan Campbell Scott, The Circle of Affection, prose and verse
 Raymond Souster, Go To Sleep, World. Toronto: Ryerson.
 John Sutherland, editor, Other Canadians: An Anthology of the New Poetry in Canada, 1940-1946 (First Statement Press, 1947), anthology

India, in English
 Harindranath Chattopadhyaya, Freedom Come ( Poetry in English ), Bombay: Nalanda Publications
 Serapia Devi, Rapid Visions ( Poetry in English )
 Raul De Loyola Furtado, Selected Poems ( Poetry in English ), second edition, revised; Bombay (first edition 1942; third edition, revised 1967)
 Vinayaka Krishna Gokak, The Song of Life and Other Poems ( Poetry in English ), Bombay: Hind Kitabs
 P. R. Kaikini, Poems of the Passionate East ( Poetry in English ), Bombay
 Fredoon Kabraji, editor, This Strange Adventure: An Anthology of Poems in English by Indians 1828-1946, London: New India Pub. Co., 140 pages; Indian poetry published in the United Kingdom

United Kingdom

 Kingsley Amis, Bright November
 W. H. Auden, The Age of Anxiety (English native living in the United States)
 John Betjeman, edited by W. H. Auden, Slick But Not Streamlined: poems & short pieces
 Cairo poets, edited by Keith Bullen and John Cromer, Salamander: A Miscellany of Poetry (anthology)
 F. W. Harvey, Gloucestershire: A Selection from the Poems of F. W. Harvey (English poet published in Scotland)
 Hamish Henderson, as Seumas Mor Maceanruig, collected Ballads of World War II
 Patrick Kavanagh, A Soul For Sale
 Philip Larkin, A Girl in Winter
 Laurie Lee, The Bloom of Candles
 Louis MacNeice, The Dark Tower
 John Pudney, Low Life
 Alan Ross, The Derelict Day
 Stephen Spender, Poems of Dedication
 Terence Tiller, Unarm, Eros
 Henry Treece, The Haunted Garden

United States
 Conrad Aiken, The Kid
 W. H. Auden, The Age of Anxiety, English native living in the United States
 R. P. Blackmur, The Good European
 Cleanth Brooks, The Well Wrought Urn: Studies in the Structure of Poetry
 Witter Bynner, Take Away the Darkness
 John Ciardi, Other Skies
 Louis Coxe, The Sea Faring
 August Derleth, editor, Dark of the Moon: Poems of Fantasy and the Macabre
 Robert Duncan, Heavenly City, Earthly City
 Richard Eberhart, Burr Oaks, including "The Fury of Aerial Bombardment"
 Robert Frost, Steeple Bush
 Jean Garrigue, The Ego and the Centaur
 Langston Hughes, Fields of Wonder
 Weldon Kees, The Fall of Magicians (his second book of poetry)
 Howard Nemerov, The Image of the Law
 John Frederick Nims, The Iron Pastoral
 Kenneth Patchen, Panels for the Walls of Heaven
 Karl Shapiro, Trial of a Poet
 William Jay Smith, Poems
 Wallace Stevens, Transport to Summer (includes "The Pure Good of Theory," "A Word With Jose Rodriguez-Feo," "Description without Place," "The House Was Quiet and the World Was Calm," "Notes Toward a Supreme Fiction," and "Esthetique du Mal"), Knopf
 Richard Wilbur, The Beautiful Changes and Other Poems, New York: Reynal and Hitchcock
 Louis Zukofsky begins writing Bottom: on Shakespeare, a long work of literary philosophy

Other in English
 Victor Daley, Creeve Roe, posthumously published, Australia
 Donagh MacDonagh, The Hungry Grass, Faber and Faber, Ireland
 Shaw Neilson, Unpublished Poems, edited by James Devaney, Angus and Robertson, Australia

Works published in other languages
Listed by nation where the work was first published and again by the poet's native land, if different; substantially revised works listed separately:

France
 Guillaume Apollinaire, pen name of Wilhelm Apollinaris de Kostrowitzky, Ombre de mon amour, publisher: P. Cailler Vesenaz (revised edition entitled Poèmes a Lou, 1955), posthumously published (died 1918)
 Antonin Artaud:
 Artaud le momo Paris: Bordas
 Ce-git, précédé de la culture indienne, Paris: K Editeur
 André Breton, Ode a Charles Fourier
 Jean Cayrol:
 Je vivrai l'amour des autres
 On vous parle, winner of the Prix Renaudot
 Blaise Cendrars, pen name of Frédéric Louis Sauser, a Swiss novelist and poet naturalized as a French citizen in 1916; all of his poetry (which he stopped writing in 1924) was published this year in these two volumes:
 Du monde entier
 Au coeur du monde
 Aimé Césaire, Cahier d'un retour au pays natal, expanded edition in book format, Martinique writer
 Jean Follain, Exister
 Eugène Guillevic, Exécutoire, poems written during the German occupation of France
 Pierre Jean Jouve:
 Hymne
 Requiem, Lausanne, Switzerland: Mermod, French author published in Switzerland
 Marie Noël, Chants et psaumes d'automne
 Henri Pichette, Apoèmes
 Raymond Queneau, Exercices de style

Indian subcontinent
Including India, Pakistan, Bangladesh, Sri Lanka and Nepal. Listed alphabetically by first name, regardless of surname:

Hindi
 Bal Krisna Rav, Kavi ki Chavi
 Kedarnath Agarwal:
 Nind Ke Badal, written in the language of common people by a notable poet of the Pragativadi movement
 Yug Ki Ganga, poems in the Pragativadi tradition
 Mishra Dvarika Prasad, epic based on Krishna legends from the Mahabharata, Srimadbhagvata, Sursagar and Sisupalavadha, with contemporary elements; written in 1942 but published this year
 Ram Dahin Mishra, Kavya Darpan, comparing Indian and Western poetics; literary criticism
 Ramadhari Singh Dinkar, Samadheni
 Sumitranandan Pant:
 , a translation of Swami Vivekanand's Song of the Sanyasin into Hindi is included under the title Sanyasi Ke Git
 Svarna Kiran

Marathi
 B. B. Borkar, Dudhasagar
 B. S. Mardhekar, Kahi Kavita
 Shanta Shelke, Varsa
 V. R. Kant, Rudravina

Oriya
 Kalindi Charan Panigrahi, romantic poems by one of the earliest modern poets in Indian literature
 Mayadhar Mansinha:
 Kamalavana, long, romantic poem
 Jibanacita, Oriya
 Nityananda Mhapatra, Pancajanya
 Sacchidananda Rout Roy, Pandulipi, poems written in free verse

Other languages of the Indian subcontinent

 A. Muthusivan, Kavitaiyum Valkkaiyum, literary criticism written in Tamil
 Akhtarul Imam, Sabrang, poems, some allegorical, some satiric, expressing dissatisfaction with traditional society; Urdu
 Amrita Pritam, Lamian Vatan, mostly lyrical poems on romantic love, Punjabi
 Bishnu Dey:
 Purbalekh, Bengali
 Bishnu De, Sandiper, Bengali
 Dimbeshwar Neog, Asama; Assamese-language
 Divya Prabha Bharali, Banhi. Aparna, her first book of poetry; Assamese-language
 Dinu Bhai Pant, Vira Gulaba, modern ballad on the heroism and skillfulness of Gulab Singh (later Maharaja Gulab Singh of Jammu and Kashmir), in the battle of Jammu against Sikh invaders; Dogri
 Jhamandas Bhatia, Sain Qutub Sah, biography written in Sindhi of the Sufi poet Qudub Shah, who wrote in that language
 Joseph Mundasseri, Rupabhadrata, literary criticism which found fault with the Marxist school of literary criticism; the debate caused by the book resulted in a split in the progressive literary movement; Malayalam
 Jyotsna Shukla, Azadinan Geeto; Gujarati
 K. S. Narasimha Swamy, Dipadamalli, Kannada
 Kaifi Azmi, pen name of Asar Husain Rizvi, Akhir-i Shab, Urdu
 Kashikanta Mishra, Kobar-git, marriage songs, Maithili
 Manohar Sharma, Aravali Ki Atma, includes nature poems such as "Aravali", "Jharano" and "Tiba", Rajasthani
 Shankara Balakrishna Joshi, also known as "Sam. Ba. Joshi", Karnana Muru Citragulu, literary criticism written in the Kannada language, studying the character of Karna as portrayed in three epics, Mahabharata, Pampa Bharata, and Kumaravyasa Bharata
 Vailoppalli Sridhara Menon, Kannikkoyttu, Malayalam

Other languages
 Thorkild Bjørnvig, Stærnen bag Gavlen ("The Star Behind the Gable"), Denmark
 Nazik Al-Malaika, Cholera, Arabic-language book published in Iraq
 Alexander Mezhirov, Дорога далеко ("The Road is Long"), edited by Pavel Antokolksy, the author's first published book, Moscow
 Giorgos Seferis, Κίχλη ("The Thrush"), Greek
 Shinoe Shōda, Sange ("Penitence"), tanka anthology about the atomic bombing of Japan, secretly published in defiance of censorship
 Màrius Torres (died 1942), Poesies, Catalan Spanish poet published in Mexico

Awards and honors
 Frost Medal: Gustav Davidson
 Consultant in Poetry to the Library of Congress (later the post would be called "Poet Laureate Consultant in Poetry to the Library of Congress"): Robert Lowell appointed this year.
 Pulitzer Prize for Poetry: Robert Lowell, Lord Weary's Castle
 Fellowship of the Academy of American Poets: Ridgely Torrence
 Canada: Governor General's Award, poetry or drama: Poems for People, Dorothy Livesay
 Australia: Grace Leven Prize for Poetry: Pacific Sea, Nan McDonald

Births
Death years link to the corresponding "[year] in poetry" article:
 January 2
 Ai, born "Florence Anthony" (died 2010), an American poet who legally changes her name
 David Shapiro, American poet, literary critic and art historian
 January 13 – David Scott (died 2022), English Anglican priest, poet, playwright and spiritual writer
 January 18 – Takeshi Kitano 北野 武, Japanese filmmaker, film editor, screenwriter, comedian, actor, author, poet and painter (surname: Kitano)
 February 19 – Bin Ramke, American poet and editor
 April 3 – Srikrishna Alanahalli (died 1989), Indian Kannada novelist and poet
 April 13 – Rae Armantrout, American poet
 April 24 – Astrid Roemer, Suriname-born Dutch poet, novelist and playwright
 March 2 – Michael Schmidt, Mexican-born English poet, academic, founder, editor and managing director of Carcanet Press and founder of PN Review
 March 3 – Clifton Snider, American poet, novelist, literary critic, scholar and educator
 May 6 – Jerry Estrin (died 1993), American poet
 May 12 – Penelope Shuttle, English poet
 May 13 – Sukanta Bhattacharya (died 1947), Bengali poet
 May 16 – Cheryl Clarke, American poet and academic
 May 23 – Jane Kenyon (died 1995), American poet and translator
 May 27 – Felix Dennis (died 2014), English publisher and poet
 June 16 – Ellen Bass, American poet
 July 18 – Dermot Healy (died 2014), Irish novelist and poet
 July 25 – Leslie Scalapino (died 2010), American poet
 August 1 – Lorna Goodison, Jamaican poet
 August 8 – Alurista (nom de plume of Alberto Baltazar Urista Heredia), American Chicano poet and activist
 October 13 – Joe Dolce, Australian poet and musician
 October 20 – Mikirō Sasaki 佐々木幹郎, also known as "Mikio Sasaki", Japanese poet and travel writer (surname: Sasaki)
 October 26 – Trevor Joyce, Irish poet
 November 13 – John Steffler, Canadian poet and novelist
 November 30 – Sergio Badilla Castillo, Chilean poet and dramatist
 December 26 – Liz Lochhead, Scottish poet and dramatist
 Also:
 Michael Casey, American poet
 Gloria Frym, American poet, fiction writer and essayist
 Reginald Gibbons, American poet
 Nasrollah Mardani (died 2003), Iranian poet
 Frank Ormsby, Northern Irish poet
 Molly Peacock, American poet of the New Formalist school and nonfiction writer
 Rosemary Sullivan, Canadian poet, biographer and anthologist

Deaths
Birth years link to the corresponding "[year] in poetry" article:
 April 9 – Desmond FitzGerald (born 1888), Irish revolutionary, poet, publicist and politician
 April 12 – C. Louis Leipoldt (born 1880), South African Afrikaans poet, writer and pediatrician
 April 30 – Anna Wickham (born 1883), English poet (suicide by hanging)
 June 25 – Minnie Gow Walsworth (born 1859), American poet
 July 13 – Yone Noguchi 野口米次郎 (born 1875), Japanese poet, fiction writer, essayist and literary critic in both Japanese and English; father of the sculptor Isamu Noguchi
 September 15 – Richard Le Gallienne (born 1866), English poet and writer
 December 19 – Duncan Campbell Scott (born 1862), Canadian poet and writer

See also

 Poetry
 List of poetry awards
 List of years in poetry

Notes

20th-century poetry
Poetry